Sound energy density or sound density is the sound energy per unit volume. The SI unit of sound energy density is the pascal (Pa), which is 1 kg⋅m−1⋅s−2 in SI base units or 1 joule per cubic metre (J/m3).

Mathematical definition
Sound energy density, denoted w, is defined by

where
p is the sound pressure;
v is the particle velocity in the direction of propagation;
c is the speed of sound.

The terms instantaneous energy density, maximum energy density, and peak energy density have meanings analogous to the related terms used for sound pressure. In speaking of average energy density, it is necessary to distinguish between the space average (at a given instant) and the time average (at a given point).

Sound energy density level
The sound energy density level gives the ratio of a sound incidence as a sound energy value in comparison to the reference level of 1 pPa (= 10−12 pascals). It is a logarithmic measure of the ratio of two sound energy densities. The unit of the sound energy density level is the decibel (dB), a non-SI unit accepted for use with the SI Units.

The sound energy density level, L(E), for a given sound energy density, E1, in pascals, is 
,

where E0 is the standard reference sound energy density

 .

See also
Particle velocity level
Sound intensity level

References

External links
Conversion: sound intensity to sound intensity level
Ohm's law as acoustic equivalent - calculations
Relationships of acoustic quantities associated with a plane progressive acoustic sound wave - pdf

Acoustics
Sound
Sound measurements
Physical quantities